Albert Ramsdell Gurney Jr. (November 1, 1930 – June 13, 2017) (sometimes credited as Pete Gurney) was an American playwright,  novelist and academic. He is known for works including The Dining Room (1982), Sweet Sue (1986/7), and The Cocktail Hour (1988), and for his Pulitzer Prize nominated play Love Letters. His series of plays about upper-class WASP life in contemporary America have been called "penetratingly witty studies of the WASP ascendancy in retreat."

Early life
Gurney was born on November 1, 1930 in Buffalo, New York to Albert Ramsdell Gurney Sr. (1896–1977), who was president of Gurney, Becker and Bourne, an insurance and real estate company in Buffalo, and Marion Spaulding (1908-2001). His parents had three children, of which Gurney was the middle: (1) Evelyn Gurney Miller (b. 1929), (2) Albert Ramsdell Gurney Jr. (b. 1930), and (3) Stephen S. Gurney (b. 1933).

His maternal grandparents were Elbridge G. Spaulding (1881–1974) and Marion Caryl Ely (1887–1971). Ely was the daughter of William Caryl Ely (1856–1921), politician and lawyer, Member of the New York State Assembly in 1883. Gurney's 2x great-grandfather was Elbridge G. Spaulding (1809–1897), a former Mayor of Buffalo, NY State Treasurer, and member of the U.S. House of Representatives who supported the idea for the first U.S. currency not backed by gold or silver, thus credited with helping to keep the Union economy afloat during the Civil War.

Gurney attended the private school Nichols School in Buffalo and graduating from St. Paul's School in Concord, New Hampshire.  He attended Williams College, graduating in 1952, and the Yale School of Drama, graduating in 1958, after which he began teaching Humanities at MIT.

Career
In 1959, following graduation from Yale, Gurney taught English and Latin at a day school, Belmont Hill School, in Belmont, Massachusetts for one year. He then joined Massachusetts Institute of Technology as a professor of humanities (1960–96) and professor of literature (1970–96).

He began writing plays such as Children and The Middle Ages while at MIT, but it was his great success with The Dining Room that allowed him to write full-time. After The Dining Room, Gurney wrote a number of plays, most of them concerning WASPs of the American northeast. While at Yale, Gurney also wrote Love in Buffalo, the first musical ever produced at the Yale School of Drama. Since then, he is known to be a prolific writer, always writing something.

His first play in New York, which ran for just one performance in October 1968, The David Show, premiered at the Players' Theater on MacDougal Street. The play was cut after its first show by sneers from the entire press except for two enthusiasts, Edith Oliver in The New Yorker and another from the Village Voice.

His 2015 play, Love and Money, is about a mature woman making plans to dispose of her fortune, and the twists that ensue. The world premiere was at New York's Signature Theatre in August 2015. Before that, The Grand Manner, a play about his real life encounter with famed actress Katharine Cornell in her production of Shakespeare's Antony and Cleopatra, was produced and performed by Lincoln Center for the summer of 2010. It was also produced in Buffalo by the Kavinoky Theatre. He appeared in several of his plays including The Dining Room and most notably Love Letters.

Personal life
In June, 1957, Gurney married Molly Goodyear They lived in Boston until 1983, when they moved their family to New York to be near the theater, television, and publishers while he was on sabbatical from MIT.  Together, they had four children:

 George Goodyear Gurney, who married Constance "Connie" Lyman Warren in 1985.
 Amy Ramsdell Gurney, who married Frederick Snow Nicholas III in 1985.
 Evelyn "Evie" R. Gurney, who married Christopher Bumcrot
 Benjamin Gurney

Gurney's father, Albert Ramsdell Gurney Sr., died in 1977 and Molly's mother, Sarah Norton, died in 1978. After their deaths, his mother, Marion, married Molly's father, George, and remained married until Marion's death in 2001, followed by George's death in 2002.

Death
Gurney died at his home in Manhattan, on June 13, 2017, at the age of 86.

Awards and honors
In 2006, Gurney was elected a member of the American Academy of Arts and Letters.

In 2007, Gurney received the PEN/Laura Pels International Foundation for Theater Award as a master American dramatist.

Gurney was awarded the Lifetime Achievement Award at the 2016 Obie Awards presented by the American Theatre Wing and The Village Voice.

Literary work

Themes
Gurney's plays often explore the theme of declining upper-class "WASP" (White Anglo-Saxon Protestant) life in contemporary America. The Wall Street Journal has called his works "penetratingly witty studies of the WASP ascendancy in retreat." Several of his works are loosely based on his patrician upbringing, including The Cocktail Hour and Indian Blood.  The New York Times  drama critic Frank Rich, in his review of The Dining Room, wrote, "As a chronicler of contemporary America's most unfashionable social stratum — upper-middle-class WASPs, this playwright has no current theatrical peer."

In his 1988 play, "The Cocktail Hour", the lead character tells her playwright son that theater critics "don't like us.... They resent us. They think we're all Republicans, all superficial and all alcoholics. Only the latter is true." The New York Times described the play as witty observations about a nearly extinct patrician class that regards psychiatry as an affront to good manners, underpaid hired help as a birthright.

In a 1989 interview with The New York Times, Gurney said, "Just as it's mentioned in The Cocktail Hour,' my great-grandfather hung up his clothes one day and walked into the Niagara River and no one understood why." Gurney added that "he was a distinguished man in Buffalo. My father could never mention it, and it affected the family well into the fourth generation as a dark and unexplainable gesture. It made my father and his father desperate to be accepted, to be conventional, and comfortable. It made them commit themselves to an ostensibly easy bourgeois world. They saw it so precariously, but the reason was never mentioned. I first learned about it after my father died."

Gurney told The Washington Post in 1982:
WASPs do have a culture — traditions, idiosyncrasies, quirks, particular signals and totems we pass on to one another.  But the WASP culture, or at least that aspect of the culture I talk about, is enough in the past so that we can now look at it with some objectivity, smile at it, and even appreciate some of its values. There was a closeness of family, a commitment to duty, to stoic responsibility, which I think we have to say weren't entirely bad."

Plays

 Ancestral Voices
 Another Antigone
 Big Bill
 Black Tie
 Buffalo Gal
 A Cheever Evening (based on stories by John Cheever)
 Children
 The Cocktail Hour
 The Comeback
 Crazy Mary
 Darlene
 The David Show
 The Dining Room
 Family Furniture 
 Far East
 The Fourth Wall
 The Golden Age
 The Golden Fleece
 The Grand Manner
 The Guest Lecturer
 Heresy
 Human Events
 Indian Blood
 Labor Day
 Later Life
 The Love Course
 Love Letters
 The Middle Ages
 Mrs. Farnsworth
 Office Hours
 O Jerusalem
 The Old Boy
 The Old One-Two
 The Open Meeting
 Overtime
 The Perfect Party
 Post Mortem
 The Problem
 The Rape of Bunny Stuntz
 Richard Cory
 Scenes from American Life
 Screen Play
 "Squash"
 The Snow Ball (based on his novel)
 Sweet Sue
 Sylvia
 The Wayside Motor Inn
 What I Did Last Summer
 Who Killed Richard Cory?

Novels
Gurney has also written several novels, including:
The Snow Ball (1984)
The Gospel According to Joe (1974)
Entertaining Strangers (1977)
Early American (1996)

Screenplays
The House of Mirth (1972)
Sylvia (1995)

References

External links

 A. R. Gurney at The Literary Encyclopedia
 
 A. R. Gurney Papers. Yale Collection of American Literature, Beinecke Rare Book and Manuscript Library.

1930 births
2017 deaths
20th-century American dramatists and playwrights
20th-century American novelists
21st-century American novelists
American male dramatists and playwrights
American male novelists
American opera librettists
Goodyear family (New York)
MIT School of Humanities, Arts, and Social Sciences faculty
Members of the American Academy of Arts and Letters
Writers from Buffalo, New York
St. Paul's School (New Hampshire) alumni
Williams College alumni
Novelists from Connecticut
Yale University alumni
Yale School of Drama alumni
20th-century American male writers
21st-century American male writers
Novelists from Massachusetts